Center of National Resistance of Ukraine (Ukrainian: Центр національного спротиву) was created March 2022, with the beginning of the full-scale aggression of the Russian Federation against Ukraine, the under the Special Operations Forces of the Armed Forces of Ukraine.

The aim of creating the Center is to teach the civilian population of Ukraine methods of non-violent resistance to the enemy. At the beginning of its activity, the Center focused its efforts mostly on the temporarily occupied territories of Ukraine.

The Center operates within the framework of "On the Foundations of National Resistance" law, which was adopted on July 16, 2021, by Ukrainian parliament and entered into force on January 1, 2022.

The website contains manuals with recommendations on various forms of resistance against the occupiers - both with weapons and non-violent forms. In addition, there is a number of educational materials on tactical medicine, cyber security, tactics, intelligence, etc. The Center systematically reports news from the temporarily occupied territories in various Ukrainian media and maintains contact with the population living there.

The center has its own channel on YouTube, where news and video instructions for guerilla fighters are published.

On July 20, 2022, the National Resistance Center published information about Russian soldiers from the 83rd Guards Air Assault Brigade (military unit 71289, garrison - the city of Ussuriysk, Primorsky Krai), who committed war crimes in the city of Bucha near Kyiv.

References 

Disaster preparedness in Ukraine